The Fernanda Pivano Award for American Literature is an Italian literary award for American authors. It is named in honor of Fernanda Pivano.

The Fernanda Pivano Award represents the work of spreading American literature that Pivano undertook in Italy. The beginning of her literary journey dates back to 1943, with the publication of the first translation of the Spoon River Anthology by Edgar Lee Masters.

Since 2009, the Award took over the specific objective of promoting the works of American writers in Italy.

References

Fiction awards
Fernanda Pivano
Awards established in 2009
2009 establishments in Italy